Loudon Park National Cemetery is a United States National Cemetery located in the city of Baltimore, Maryland. Administered by the United States Department of Veterans Affairs, it encompasses , and as of the end of 2005, had 7,138 interments. It is currently closed to new interments, and is maintained by the Baltimore National Cemetery.

The cemetery's civil war interments include about 2,300 union soldiers and 650 confederate soldiers.

History 
Loudon Park National Cemetery was originally established as a plot within the Loudon Park Cemetery. It was one of the 14 original National Cemeteries established under the National Cemetery Act on July 17, 1862. Most of the original interments were from area veteran hospitals. During the American Civil War, Fort McHenry was a prisoner of war camp, and the prisoners who died while incarcerated there were interred at Loudon Park National Cemetery.

Land acquisitions in 1874, 1875, 1882, 1883 and lastly in 1903, brought the cemetery to its current size.

Loudon Park National Cemetery was placed on the National Register of Historic Places in 1996.

Notable monuments 
 The Maryland Sons Monument, a three-foot-tall terra cotta frieze with a bas relief sculpture. Dedicated in 1885.
 Rigby Monument, a marble monument erected in 1891 dedicated to Captain James H. Rigby and the 1st Maryland Light Artillery.
 The Unknown Dead Monument, a marble sculpture, dedicated in 1895.
 The Maryland Naval Monument, dedicated in 1896.
 The Confederate Monument, erected in 1912, marking the burial place of Confederate prisoners of war.

Notable interments 
 Medal of Honor recipients
 Private Henry G. Costin, for action during World War I
 Private James T. Jennings, for action during the American Civil War
 First Sergeant Henry Newman, for action in Arizona Territory during the Indian Wars
 First Sergeant Wilhelm O. Philipsen, for action in the Colorado Territory during the Indian Wars
 Sergeant William Taylor, two-time recipient for action during the Civil War

References

External links
National Cemetery Administration
Loudon Park National Cemetery

Loudon Park National Cemetery at Find a Grave
, including photo from 1998, at Maryland Historical Trust

Cemeteries in Baltimore
United States national cemeteries
Cemeteries on the National Register of Historic Places in Baltimore
Historic American Landscapes Survey in Maryland
1862 establishments in Maryland